The 2008–09 Butler Bulldogs men's basketball team represented Butler University in the 2008–09 NCAA Division I men's basketball season. Their head coach was Brad Stevens, serving his 2nd year. The Bulldogs played their home games at the Hinkle Fieldhouse, which has a capacity of approximately 10,000.

The Bulldogs won the 2009 Horizon League Men's Basketball Regular Season Championship and received an at-large bid to the 2009 NCAA Division I men's basketball tournament, earning a 9 seed in the South Region. They fell to 8 seed LSU .

Roster

Schedule

|-
!colspan=12 style=|Exhibition

|-
!colspan=9 style="background:#13294B; color:#FFFFFF;"|Non-conference regular season

|-
!colspan=9 style="background:#13294B; color:#FFFFFF;"|Horizon League Play

|-
!colspan=9 style="background:#13294B; color:#FFFFFF;"| Horizon League tournament

|-
!colspan=9 style="background:#13294B; color:#FFFFFF;"|NCAA tournament

Rankings

See also
2009 NCAA Division I men's basketball tournament

References

Butler
Butler Bulldogs men's basketball seasons
Butler
Butl
Butl